The United States Basketball Writers Association National Coach of the Year Award is an award given by the United States Basketball Writers Association to best women's college basketball coach since season 1989-90.

Winners

See also
United States Basketball Writers Association

References

Awards established in 1989
College basketball coach of the year awards in the United States